Haydarköy is a village in Mut district of Mersin Province, Turkey. It is in the valley of Göksu River in Toros Mountains. At  it is to the east of Göksu River and to the west of Turkish state highway  . The population of the village was 172 as of 2012. The name of the village refers to the founder of the village named Haydar. Haydarköy is famous for a monumental olive tree situated just to the west of the village. Its age is determined to be 1300 (oldest in Turkey) by the forestry authorities and it is legally declared as a national monument. The major economic activity of the village is agriculture. Olive, apricot, pomegranate and figs are the main crops.

References

Villages in Mut District